Maddikera Agraharam is a small village in Maddikera mandal, Kurnool District, Andhra Pradesh State in India.

References

Villages in Kurnool district